The Abbot of Inchcolm, or until 1235, the Prior of Inchcolm, was the head of the Augustinian monastic community of Inchcolm (Innse Choluim; Latin Insula Columbae; Lowland Scots: St Comb's Isle).

List of position holders

Priors of Inchcolm
 Brice (Máel Brigte?), fl. 1162x1178
 Roger, fl. 1163x1178
 Walter (I), x1179-1210
 Michael, 1210-1211
 Simon, 1211-?
 William, ?-1224
 Nigel of Jedburgh, 1224-x1228
 Henry, x1228-1243

Abbots of Inchcolm
 Henry, promoted to abbot in 1235; resigned in 1243
 Thomas, 1243/4-1268
 William, 1268-1277x
 Brice, fl. 1296
 None of the abbots are known until:
 John Dersy, died 1394
 Laurence, x1399-1417
 Walter Bower, 1417-1449
 John Kers, 1449-1460x5
 Michael Harwar, 1460x5-x1490
 Alexander Scrimgeour, x1490-1491
 Robert de Fontibus, 1491-1492
 Thomas Inglis, 1492-1505
 John Elwand (Elliot), 1505-x1532
 Richard Abercromby, 1532-1543

Titular abbots/commendators
 James Stewart, 1544-1581;(after 1558 frequently called commendator); died 1590
 Henry Stewart, died 1612

See also 
 Bishop of Dunkeld

References 

Easson, D.E., & MacDonald, Angus, (eds.), Charters of the Abbey of Inchcolm, (Edinburgh, 1938)

Inchcolm
Inchcolm